The Mayor of Tararua officiates over the Tararua District of New Zealand's North Island.

Tracey Collis is the current mayor of Tararua. She has been mayor since 2016.

List of mayors
Since its inception in 1989, Tararua District has had five mayors:

References

Tararua
Tararua
Tararua
Tararua District
Tararua